The 1998–99 daytime network television schedule for the six major English-language commercial broadcast networks in the United States in operation during that television season covers the weekday daytime hours from September 1998 to August 1999. The schedule is followed by a list per network of returning series, new series, and series canceled after the 1997–98 season.

Affiliates fill time periods not occupied by network programs with local or syndicated programming. PBS – which offers daytime programming through a children's program block, branded as PTV at the time – is not included, as its member television stations have local flexibility over most of their schedules and broadcast times for network shows may vary. Also not included is Pax TV, a venture of Paxson Communications that debuted on August 31, 1998; although Pax carried a limited schedule of first-run programs in its early years, its schedule otherwise was composed mainly of syndicated reruns.

Legend

 New series are highlighted in bold.

Schedule
 All times correspond to U.S. Eastern and Pacific Time scheduling (except for some live sports or events). Except where affiliates slot certain programs outside their network-dictated timeslots, subtract one hour for Central, Mountain, Alaska, and Hawaii-Aleutian times.
 Local schedules may differ, as affiliates have the option to pre-empt or delay network programs. Such scheduling may be limited to preemptions caused by local or national breaking news or weather coverage (which may force stations to tape delay certain programs in overnight timeslots or defer them to a co-operated or other contracted station in their regular timeslot) and any major sports events scheduled to air in a weekday timeslot (mainly during major holidays). Stations may air shows at other times at their preference.

Monday–Friday

Notes:
 NBC allowed owned-and-operated and affiliated stations the preference of airing Another World and Days of Our Lives in reverse order from the network's recommended scheduling; this structure was carried over when Passions debuted in the 2:00 p.m. ET timeslot on July 5, 1999.
 Another World aired its last episode on June 25, 1999; the premiere of Passions was scheduled nine days after its timeslot predecessor's series finale due to NBC's scheduled coverage of the Wimbledon tennis tournament preempting the network's daytime schedule during the week of June 28.
 (+) On September 3, 1999, Leeza aired its final episode on NBC; the program moved to first-run syndication beginning with its September 13 episode. NBC returned the 11:00 a.m. ET hour to its affiliates on September 6; at that time, NBC reclaimed the 9:00 a.m. ET hour from its affiliates in order to air Later Today, a lifestyle and entertainment-oriented extension of Today. 
 The time period that the first hour of the Fox Kids weekday block occupied was turned over to Fox-affiliated stations in September 1999. Prior to the change, some Fox stations had aired that hour of the block in the afternoon in order to air either local morning newscasts or syndicated programming.
 The WB turned over the morning timeslot occupied by part of its children's programming block to its affiliates on September 3, 1999. A few WB-affiliated stations (mostly major-market outlets owned by Tribune Broadcasting) deferred the block to the afternoon in order to air either local morning newscasts or syndicated programs.

Saturday

Notes:
 Fox Kids originally intended to air a series based on Captain America at 10:30 a.m. ET, however Marvel Comics' then-recent bankruptcy caused the series to be cancelled during pre-production; hence, The Secret Files of the Spy Dogs was moved there from its originally intended weekday scheduling.
 Kids' WB also aired Invasion America at 10:00 a.m. ET until October 10.

Sunday

By network

ABC

Returning series:
101 Dalmatians: The Series 
ABC World News This Morning
ABC World News Tonight with Peter Jennings
All My Children
The Bugs Bunny and Tweety Show
Disney's One Saturday Morning
Doug
Recess
Pepper Ann
General Hospital
Good Morning America
The New Adventures of Winnie the Pooh 
One Life to Live
Port Charles
Schoolhouse Rock! 
Squigglevision
The View

New series:
Hercules
Mickey Mouse Works

Not returning from 1997–98:
Jungle Cubs

CBS

Returning series:
As the World Turns
The Bold and the Beautiful
CBS Morning News
CBS News Saturday Morning
CBS This Morning
CBS Evening News
CBS News Sunday Morning
Face the Nation
Guiding Light
The Price Is Right
The Young and the Restless

New series:
Anatole
Birdz
Dumb Bunnies
Flying Rhino Junior High
Franklin
Mythic Warriors
Rupert 
Tales from the Cryptkeeper 

Not returning from 1997–98:
Beakman's World
CBS Storybreak 
Fudge
The New Ghostwriter Mysteries
The Sports Illustrated for Kids Show
The Weird Al Show
Wheel 2000

NBC

Returning series:
Another World
City Guys
Days of Our Lives
Hang Time
Leeza
NBA Inside Stuff
NBC News at Sunrise
NBC Nightly News
Saved by the Bell: The New Class
Sunset Beach
Today

New series:
One World
Passions

Fox

Returning series:
Bobby's World 
Cartoon Cabana
Goosebumps
Life with Louie
Ned's Newt
Power Rangers Power Playback
Power Rangers in Space
Space Goofs
Spider-Man 
Toonsylvania

New series:
Digimon: Digital Monsters
Donkey Kong Country
Godzilla: The Series
Mad Jack the Pirate
The Magic School Bus 
The Magician
The Mr. Potato Head Show
Mystic Knights of Tir Na Nog
The New Addams Family
The New Woody Woodpecker Show
Oggy and the Cockroaches
Power Rangers Lost Galaxy
The Secret Files of the Spy Dogs
Young Hercules

Not returning from 1997–98:
The Adventures of Sam & Max: Freelance Police
Beetleborgs Metallix (moved to UPN)
C Bear and Jamal
Eerie, Indiana
Eerie, Indiana: The Other Dimension
Mowgli: The New Adventures of the Jungle Book
Ninja Turtles: The Next Mutation
Power Rangers: Turbo
Power Rangers Zeo
Silver Surfer
The Spooktacular New Adventures of Casper
Stickin' Around
X-Men (moved to UPN)

UPN

Returning series:
Algo's FACTory
The Incredible Hulk 

New series:
Beetleborgs  
Incredible Hulk and Friends (reruns of The Incredible Hulk, Fantastic Four and Iron Man)
X-Men  
Spider-Man 
Spider-Man and His Amazing Friends 

Not returning from 1997–98:
Breaker High
Jumanji (moved to BKN)
Sweet Valley High

The WB

Returning series:
Animaniacs
Men in Black: The Series
The New Batman/Superman Adventures
Pinky and the Brain
The Sylvester & Tweety Mysteries
Tiny Toon Adventures

New series:
Batman Beyond
The Big Cartoonie Show
Brats of the Lost Nebula
Histeria!
Invasion America
Pinky, Elmyra & the Brain
Pokémon

Not returning from 1997–98:
Bugs 'n' Daffy
Captain Planet and the Planeteers 
Channel Umptee-3

See also
1998–99 United States network television schedule (prime-time)
1998–99 United States network television schedule (late night)

References

Sources
 
 
 
 
 
 

United States weekday network television schedules
1998 in American television
1999 in American television